The Department of Dramatic Theatre (DAMU) is one of three departments at the Academy of Performing Arts in Prague (alongside the Film and TV school and the Department of Music). The academy was opened in 1945 immediately after the Second World War as a part of the newly created academy for the arts. DAMU is a member of the European League of Institutes of the Arts (ELIA) and the European network on cultural management and policy (ENCATC).

Departments

The two main departments of the school are:
 Department of Dramatic Theatre, which prepares students for the repertory theatre system and educates them in interpreting classic and contemporary texts
 Department of Alternative Theatre and Puppetry, including a sub-department devoted to scenography and a division for alternative stage design

Other departments include:
 Department of Stage Design
 Department of Authorial Creation and Pedagogy, educating in performance, including an improvisational acting discipline developed by Professor Ivan Vyskočil, called "Acting with the Inner Partner".
 Department of Drama in Education, educating in the role of theatre in education
 Department of Theory and Criticism, educating in theatre criticism and theoretical subjects
 Department of Arts Management, educating in theatre management

The Department of Dramatic Theatre has recently introduced doctoral studies in four areas: 
 Stage Creation and the Theory of Stage Creation
 Theory and Practice of Theatre Creation
 Alternative Theatre, Puppetry and its Theory
 Authorial Acting and Theory of Authorial Creation and Pedagogy

Notable alumni
 Anda-Louise Bogza, Romanian singer.
 Ivana Chýlková (born 1963), Czech actress, graduated from DAMU in 1985.
 Štěpánka Haničincová, TV presenter.
 Petr Haničinec, actor
 Juraj Herz, Slovak film director (The Cremator), studied at DAMU's Department of Puppetry in 1954–1958.
 Tomáš Klus (born 1986), Czech singer-songwriter, graduated from DAMU in drama in 2012.
 Jan Kubíček (1927–2013), Czech constructivist painter and graphic designer, studied at DAMU in 1954–1957.
 Karel Roden (born 1962), Czech actor, graduated from DAMU in 1985.
 Martin Stropnický (born 1956), Czech politician, Minister of Foreign Affairs (2017–), graduated from DAMU in 1980.
 Jan Švankmajer (born 1934), Czech film-maker and animator, studied at DAMU's Department of Puppetry in 1954-1958.
 Alena Vostrá (1938–1992), Czech novelist, graduated from DAMU in 1966 in dramaturgy.

Deans of DAMU 
 1946–1948 Jiří Frejka
 1948–1949 Klementina Rektorisová
 1949–1950 František Götz
 1950–1952 Jan Kopecký
 1952–1953 František Götz
 1953–1954 Vladimír Adámek
 1954–1955 František Salzer
 1955–1958 Josef Bezdíček
 1958–1961 František Salzer
 1961–1963 Antonín Dvořák
 1963–1970 František Salzer
 1970–1972 Jan Císař
 1972–1985 Eva Šmeralová
 1985–1989 Jana Makovská
 1990–1991 Jan Dušek
 1991–1994 Miloslav Klíma
 1994–1997 Miloš Horanský
 1997–2000 Vladimír Mikeš
 2000–2006 Markéta Kočvarová-Schartová
 2006–2013 Jan Hančil
 2013–present Doubravka Svobodová

References

External links
 Faculty of Theatre - official web
The Prague Summer Theatre School at the Theatre Faculty of the Academy of Performing Arts (DAMU)

Academy of Performing Arts in Prague
Art schools in the Czech Republic
Drama schools in the Czech Republic